Alexandre Melo Ribeiro da Silva (born 11 February 1999), known as Alexandre Melo or simply Alexandre, is a Brazilian footballer who plays as a left back for Joinville Esporte Clube

Career statistics

Club

References

1999 births
Living people
Association football defenders
Campeonato Brasileiro Série A players
Campeonato Brasileiro Série B players
CR Vasco da Gama players
Cuiabá Esporte Clube players
Clube de Regatas Brasil players
Footballers from Rio de Janeiro (city)
Brazilian footballers